Robert Gerringer (born Robert Geiringer; May 12, 1926 – November 8, 1989) was an American character actor perhaps best known as Dr. Dave Woodard on the soap opera Dark Shadows, a role he played during 1967. Gerringer left the show because he refused to cross the picket line during a technician's strike; he was replaced by actor Peter Turgeon for six episodes and the character then killed off.

Gerringer was born in New York City, the son of Mary Agnes (née Moran), a teacher, and Arthur Joseph Geiringer, a surgeon. He appeared in the film The Exorcist (1973) and in soap operas including The Guiding Light, Texas, in which he played Houston attorney Striker Bellman; and The Edge of Night. He died from a stroke at age 63 in Damariscotta, Maine.

Filmography

References

External links

Robert Gerringer and Patricia Falkenhain papers, 1930–1990, held by the Billy Rose Theatre Division, New York Public Library for the Performing Arts
Clips from Texas episodes

1926 births
1989 deaths
American male film actors
American male television actors
Male actors from New York City
20th-century American male actors